Christoph Brüx (born 13 December 1965) is a German sculptor, painter, composer, pianist, keyboardist, arranger and music producer.

He composed for artists such as No Angels, Matthias Reim, The Underdog Project (Summer Jam), Brooklyn Bounce etc., and he also composed film scores.

Biography
Brüx was born in Sonsbeck (North Rhine-Westphalia). Until 1985 he went to school (Städtisches Stiftsgymnasium Xanten). Following his talent in music, he early began taking piano lessons and later he graduated at a music conservatoire.
Brüx was composing for several interpreters such as:
Bro'Sis: whose first album Never Forget (Where You Come From), which Brüx took part in, has been released to the public in January 2002, scored in Germany platinum.
No Angels: the album Pure where he took part in, rose to No. 1 in the German album charts and No. 3 and No. 9 in Austria and Switzerland.

He wrote music for several films (also industry and corporate videos):
TKKG – Der Club der Detektive was nominated in 2007 for the attendance at the German children media festival Goldener Spatz.

Already in the youth his sensitivity showed up in relation to its environment. His large respect for nature particularly to results in his touching underwater video "Niklas' Theme".

Today Brüx is working and living in Hamburg, Germany, where he in his studio besides music even with the visual arts (painting, sculpture) engaged.

Projects

Sculptures and paintings

Bands 
SMC Unity
Members: Sofie St. Claire, Matthias Menck, Christoph Brüx
Dolphin Sound
Members: Christoph Brüx, Matthias Menck

Discography

Filmography
Für die Familie (For the family) (short-movie) (Germany 2004)
Alina (Alina) (TV-series) (Germany 2005)
Alinas Traum (Alinas dream) (TV-movie) (Germany 2005)

Others
CD: MENTAL STRATEGIES for your SUCCESS
Synth Power SM-MOT-02 (Yamaha SmartMedia card for Synthesizer of the Yamaha Motif-series)

Associated acts

See also 
 List of music arrangers

References

External links 

the website of Christoph Brüx
swisscharts: Christoph Brüx
Niklas' Theme (under water video) filmmaking and music by Christoph Bruex
google profile

1965 births
Living people
German record producers
German film score composers
Male film score composers
German male composers
German house musicians
German electronic musicians
Eurodance musicians
German pop musicians
Ambient musicians
German music arrangers
Musicians from Hamburg
20th-century German painters
German male painters
21st-century German painters
21st-century German male artists
German pianists
German keyboardists
20th-century German sculptors
20th-century German male artists
German male sculptors
German male pianists
21st-century pianists
21st-century German male musicians
Artists from Hamburg
People from Wesel (district)